Alain Desaever (3 October 1952 – 6 June 2014) was a Belgian racing cyclist. He rode in the 1979 and 1980 Tour de France.

References

External links

1952 births
2014 deaths
Belgian male cyclists
People from Nieuwpoort, Belgium
Cyclists from West Flanders